Kildale is a railway station on the Esk Valley Line, which runs between Middlesbrough and Whitby via Nunthorpe. It is owned by Network Rail and managed by Northern Trains.

History
The station opened in April 1858, when the North Yorkshire and Cleveland Railway extended their line from Ingleby Junction (now Battersby) to Kildale. The line was further extended to Commondale and Castleton Moor, in April 1861. Through services to Whitby Town began following the opening of the section between Grosmont and Castleton Moor, the last section of the line to be opened, with service commencing in October 1865.

The station used to have a passing loop. The line, however, now runs as single track for 14 miles and 47 chains from Battersby to Glaisdale.

The station used to have a wooden bridge, which allowed access to St Cuthbert's Church on the north side of the line. During the early 1880s, the North Eastern Railway replaced the wooden bridge with a cast iron structure.

Facilities
The station has one platform, which has seating, a waiting shelter and an emergency help point. There is step-free access to the platform. There is a small car park and cycle storage at the station.

Kildale is not part of the Northern Trains penalty fare network, as ticket machines have not yet (as of October 2020) been installed at the station.

Services

As of the May 2021 timetable change, the station is served by four trains per day towards Whitby, and Middlesbrough via Nunthorpe. Most trains continue to Newcastle via Hartlepool. All services are operated by Northern Trains.

References

External links
 
 

Railway stations in North Yorkshire
DfT Category F1 stations
Former North Eastern Railway (UK) stations
Railway stations in Great Britain opened in 1861
Northern franchise railway stations